Psychoanalysis is a set of theories and therapeutic techniques that deal in part with the unconscious mind, and which together form a method of treatment for mental disorders. The discipline was established in the early 1890s by Sigmund Freud, whose work stemmed partly from the clinical work of Josef Breuer and others. Freud developed and refined the theory and practice of psychoanalysis until his death in 1939. In an encyclopedia article, he identified the cornerstones of psychoanalysis as – "the assumption that there are unconscious mental processes, the recognition of the theory of repression and resistance, the appreciation of the importance of sexuality and of the Oedipus complex." Freud's students Alfred Adler and Carl Gustav Jung developed offshoots of psychoanalysis which they called individual psychology (Adler) and Analytical Psychology (Jung), although Freud himself wrote a number of criticisms of them and emphatically denied that they were forms of psychoanalysis. Psychoanalysis was later developed in different directions by neo-Freudian thinkers, such as Erich Fromm, Karen Horney, and Harry Stack Sullivan.

Freud distinguished between a conscious and unconscious mind, arguing that the unconscious mind largely determines behaviour and cognition owing to unconscious drives. Freud observed that attempts to bring such drives into awareness triggers resistance in the form of defense mechanisms, particularly repression, and that conflicts between conscious and unconscious material can result in mental disturbances. He also postulated that unconscious material can be found in dreams and unintentional acts, including mannerisms and Freudian slips. Psychoanalytic therapy developed as a means to improve mental health by bringing unconscious material into consciousness. Psychoanalysts place a large emphasis on early childhood in an individual's development. During therapy, a psychoanalyst aims to induce transference, whereby patients relive their infantile conflicts by projecting onto the analyst feelings of love, dependence and anger.

During psychoanalytic sessions a patient traditionally lies on a couch, and an analyst sits just behind and out of sight. The patient expresses their thoughts, including free associations, fantasies, and dreams, from which the analyst infers the unconscious conflicts causing the patient's symptoms and character problems. Through the analysis of these conflicts, which includes interpreting the transference and countertransference (the analyst's feelings for the patient), the analyst confronts the patient's pathological defence mechanisms to help the patient understand themselves better.

Psychoanalysis is a controversial discipline, and its effectiveness as a treatment has been contested, although it retains influence within psychiatry. Psychoanalytic concepts are also widely used outside the therapeutic arena, in areas such as psychoanalytic literary criticism and film criticism, analysis of fairy tales, philosophical perspectives such as Freudo-Marxism, and other cultural phenomena.

History

1890s
The idea of psychoanalysis first began to receive serious attention under Sigmund Freud, who formulated his own theory of psychoanalysis in Vienna in the 1890s. Freud was a neurologist trying to find an effective treatment for patients with neurotic or hysterical symptoms. Freud realised that there were mental processes that were not conscious whilst he was employed as a neurological consultant at the Children's Hospital, where he noticed that many aphasic children had no apparent organic cause for their symptoms. He then wrote a monograph about this subject. In 1885, Freud obtained a grant to study with Jean-Martin Charcot, a famed neurologist, at the Salpêtrière in Paris, where he followed the clinical presentations of Charcot, particularly in the areas of hysteria, paralyses and the anaesthesias. Charcot had introduced hypnotism as an experimental research tool and developed photographic representation of clinical symptoms.

Freud's first theory to explain hysterical symptoms was presented in Studies on Hysteria (1895), co-authored with his mentor the distinguished physician Josef Breuer, which was generally seen as the birth of psychoanalysis. The work was based on Breuer's treatment of Bertha Pappenheim, referred to in case studies by the pseudonym "Anna O.", treatment which Pappenheim herself had dubbed the "talking cure". Breuer wrote that many factors could result in such symptoms, including various types of emotional trauma, and he also credited work by others such as Pierre Janet; while Freud contended that at the root of hysterical symptoms were repressed memories of distressing occurrences, almost always having direct or indirect sexual associations.

Around the same time, Freud attempted to develop a neuro-physiological theory of unconscious mental mechanisms, which he soon gave up. It remained unpublished in his lifetime. The term 'psychoanalysis' was first introduced by Freud in his essay titled "Heredity and etiology of neuroses" (""), written and published in French in 1896.

In 1896, Freud also published his seduction theory, claiming to have uncovered repressed memories of incidents of sexual abuse for all his current patients, from which he proposed that the preconditions for hysterical symptoms are sexual excitations in infancy. Though in 1896 he had reported that his patients "had no feeling of remembering the [infantile sexual] scenes", and assured him "emphatically of their unbelief", in later accounts he claimed that they had told him that they had been sexually abused in infancy. By 1898 he had privately acknowledged to his friend and colleague Wilhelm Fliess that he no longer believed in his theory, though he did not state this publicly until 1906. 

Building on his claims that the patients reported infantile sexual abuse experiences, Freud subsequently contended that his clinical findings in the mid-1890s provided evidence of the occurrence of unconscious fantasies, supposedly to cover up memories of infantile masturbation. Only much later did he claim the same findings as evidence for Oedipal desires. In the latter part of the 20th century, several Freud scholars challenged Freud's perception of the patients who informed him of childhood sexual abuse, arguing that he had imposed his preconceived notions on his patients. 

By 1899, Freud had theorised that dreams had symbolic significance, and generally were specific to the dreamer. Freud formulated his second psychological theory—which hypotheses that the unconscious has or is a "primary process" consisting of symbolic and condensed thoughts, and a "secondary process" of logical, conscious thoughts. This theory was published in his 1899 book, The Interpretation of Dreams, which Freud thought of as his most significant work. Freud outlined a new topographic theory, which theorised that unacceptable sexual wishes were repressed into the "System Unconscious". These wishes were made unconscious due to society's condemnation of premarital sexual activity, and this repression created anxiety. This "topographic theory" is still popular in much of Europe, although it has fallen out of favour in much of North America, where it has been largely supplanted by structural theory. In addition, The Interpretation of Dreams contained Freud's first conceptualisation of the Oedipal complex, which asserted that young boys are sexually attracted to their mothers and envious of their fathers for being able to have sex with their mothers.

Psychologist Frank Sulloway in his book Freud, Biologist of the Mind: Beyond the Psychoanalytic Legend argues that Freud's biological theories like libido were rooted in the biological hypothesis that accompanied the work of Charles Darwin, citing theories of Krafft-Ebing, Molland, Havelock Ellis, Haeckel, Wilhelm Fliess as influencing Freud.

1900–1940s
In 1905, Freud published Three Essays on the Theory of Sexuality in which he laid out his discovery of the psychosexual phases, which categorised early childhood development into five stages depending on what sexual afinity a child possessed at the stage:

 Oral (ages 0–2);
 Anal (2–4);
 Phallic-oedipal or First genital (3–6);
 Latency (6–puberty); and
 Mature genital (puberty–onward).

His early formulation included the idea that because of societal restrictions, sexual wishes were repressed into an unconscious state, and that the energy of these unconscious wishes could be result in anxiety or physical symptoms. Early treatment techniques, including hypnotism and abreaction, were designed to make the unconscious conscious in order to relieve the pressure and the apparently resulting symptoms. This method would later on be left aside by Freud, giving free association a bigger role.

In On Narcissism (1915), Freud turned his attention to the titular subject of narcissism. Freud characterized the difference between energy directed at the self versus energy directed at others using a system known as cathexis. By 1917, in "Mourning and Melancholia", he suggested that certain depressions were caused by turning guilt-ridden anger on the self. In 1919, through "A Child is Being Beaten", he began to address the problems of self-destructive behavior and sexual masochism. Based on his experience with depressed and self-destructive patients, and pondering the carnage of World War I, Freud became dissatisfied with considering only oral and sexual motivations for behavior. By 1920, Freud addressed the power of identification (with the leader and with other members) in groups as a motivation for behavior in Group Psychology and the Analysis of the Ego. In that same year, Freud suggested his dual drive theory of sexuality and aggression in Beyond the Pleasure Principle, to try to begin to explain human destructiveness. Also, it was the first appearance of his "structural theory" consisting of three new concepts id, ego, and superego.

Three years later, in 1923, he summarised the ideas of id, ego, and superego in The Ego and the Id. In the book, he revised the whole theory of mental functioning, now considering that repression was only one of many defense mechanisms, and that it occurred to reduce anxiety. Hence, Freud characterised repression as both a cause and a result of anxiety. In 1926, in "Inhibitions, Symptoms and Anxiety", Freud characterised how intrapsychic conflict among drive and superego caused anxiety, and how that anxiety could lead to an inhibition of mental functions, such as intellect and speech. In 1924, Otto Rank published The Trauma of Birth, which analysed culture and philosophy in relation to separation anxiety which occurred before the development of an Oedipal complex. Freud's theories, however, characterized no such phase. According to Freud, the Oedipus complex was at the centre of neurosis, and was the foundational source of all art, myth, religion, philosophy, therapy—indeed of all human culture and civilization. It was the first time that anyone in Freud's inner circle had characterised something other than the Oedipus complex as contributing to intrapsychic development, a notion that was rejected by Freud and his followers at the time.

By 1936 the "Principle of Multiple Function" was clarified by Robert Waelder. He widened the formulation that psychological symptoms were caused by and relieved conflict simultaneously. Moreover, symptoms (such as phobias and compulsions) each represented elements of some drive wish (sexual and/or aggressive), superego, anxiety, reality, and defenses. Also in 1936, Anna Freud, Sigmund's daughter, published her seminal book, The Ego and the Mechanisms of Defense, outlining numerous ways the mind could shut upsetting things out of consciousness.

1940s–present
When Hitler's power grew, the Freud family and many of their colleagues fled to London. Within a year, Sigmund Freud died.  In the United States, also following the death of Freud, a new group of psychoanalysts began to explore the function of the ego. Led by Heinz Hartmann, the group built upon understandings of the synthetic function of the ego as a mediator in psychic functioning, distinguishing such from autonomous ego functions (e.g. memory and intellect). These "ego psychologists" of the 1950s paved a way to focus analytic work by attending to the defenses (mediated by the ego) before exploring the deeper roots to the unconscious conflicts.

In addition, there was growing interest in child psychoanalysis. Psychoanalysis has been used as a research tool into childhood development, and is still used to treat certain mental disturbances. In the 1960s, Freud's early thoughts on the childhood development of female sexuality were challenged; this challenge led to the development of a variety of understandings of female sexual development, many of which modified the timing and normality of several of Freud's theories. Several researchers followed Karen Horney's studies of societal pressures that influence the development of women.

In the first decade of the 21st century, there were approximately 35 training institutes for psychoanalysis in the United States accredited by the American Psychoanalytic Association (APsaA), which is a component organization of the International Psychoanalytical Association (IPA), and there are over 3000 graduated psychoanalysts practicing in the United States. The IPA accredits psychoanalytic training centers through such "component organisations" throughout the rest of the world, including countries such as Serbia, France, Germany, Austria, Italy, Switzerland, and many others, as well as about six institutes directly in the United States.

Psychoanalysis as a movement
Freud founded the Psychological Wednesday Society in 1902, which Edward Shorter argues was the beginning of psychoanalysis as a movement. This society became the Vienna Psychoanalytic Society in 1908 in the same year as the first international congress of psychoanalysis held in Salzburg, Austria. Alfred Adler was one of the most active members in this society in its early years.

The second congress of psychoanalysis took place in Nuremberg, Germany in 1910. At this congress, Ferenczi called for the creation of an International Psychoanalytic Association with Jung as president for life. A third congress was held in Weimar in 1911. The London Psychoanalytical Society was founded in 1913 by Ernest Jones.

Developments of alternative forms of psychotherapy

Cognitive behavioural therapy (CBT)
In the 1950s, psychoanalysis was the main modality of psychotherapy. Behavioural models of psychotherapy started to assume a more central role in psychotherapy in the 1960s. Aaron T. Beck, a psychiatrist trained in a psychoanalytic tradition, set out to test the psychoanalytic models of depression empirically and found that conscious ruminations of loss and personal failing were correlated with depression. He suggested that distorted and biased beliefs were a causal factor of depression, publishing an influential paper in 1967 after a decade of research using the construct of schemas to explain the depression. Beck developed this empirically supported hypothesis for the cause of depression into a talking therapy called cognitive behavioral therapy (CBT) in the early 1970s.

Attachment theory

Attachment theory was developed theoretically by John Bowlby and formalized empirically by Mary Ainsworth. Bowlby was trained psychoanalytically but was concerned about some properties of psychoanalysis; he was troubled by the dogmatism of psychoanalysis at the time, its arcane terminology, the lack of attention to environment in child behaviour, and the concepts derived from talking therapy to child behaviour. In response, he developed an alternative conceptualization of child behaviour based on principles on ethology. Bowlby's theory of attachment rejects Freud's model of psychosexual development based on the Oedipal model.  For his work, Bowlby was shunned from psychoanalytical circles who did not accept his theories. Nonetheless, his conceptualization was adopted widely by mother-infant research in the 1970s.

Theories
The predominant psychoanalytic theories can be organised into several theoretical schools. Although these perspectives differ, most of them emphasize the influence of unconscious elements on the conscious. There has also been considerable work done on consolidating elements of conflicting theories.

There are some persistent conflicts among psychoanalysts regarding specific causes of certain syndromes, and some disputes regarding the ideal treatment techniques. In the 21st century, psychoanalytic ideas have found influence in fields such as childcare, education, literary criticism, cultural studies, mental health, and particularly psychotherapy. Though most mainstream psychoanalysts subscribe to modern strains of psychaoanalytical thought, there are groups who follow the precepts of a single psychoanalyst and their school of thought. Psychoanalytic ideas also play roles in some types of literary analysis such as archetypal literary criticism.

Topographic theory
Topographic theory was named and first described by Sigmund Freud in The Interpretation of Dreams (1899). The theory hypothesizes that the mental apparatus can be divided into the systems Conscious, Preconscious, and Unconscious. These systems are not anatomical structures of the brain but, rather, mental processes. Although Freud retained this theory throughout his life he largely replaced it with the structural theory.

Structural theory
Structural theory divides the psyche into the id, the ego, and the super-ego. The id is present at birth as the repository of basic instincts, which Freud called "Triebe" ("drives"). Unorganized and unconscious, it operates merely on the 'pleasure principle', without realism or foresight. The ego develops slowly and gradually, being concerned with mediating between the urging of the id and the realities of the external world; it thus operates on the 'reality principle'. The super-ego is held to be the part of the ego in which self-observation, self-criticism and other reflective and judgmental faculties develop. The ego and the super-ego are both partly conscious and partly unconscious.

Theoretical and clinical approaches
During the twentieth century, many different clinical and theoretical models of psychoanalysis emerged.

Ego psychology
Ego psychology was initially suggested by Freud in Inhibitions, Symptoms and Anxiety (1926), while major steps forward would be made through Anna Freud's work on defense mechanisms, first published in her book The Ego and the Mechanisms of Defence (1936).

The theory was refined by Hartmann, Loewenstein, and Kris in a series of papers and books from 1939 through the late 1960s. Leo Bellak was a later contributor. This series of constructs, paralleling some of the later developments of cognitive theory, includes the notions of autonomous ego functions: mental functions not dependent, at least in origin, on intrapsychic conflict. Such functions include: sensory perception, motor control, symbolic thought, logical thought, speech, abstraction, integration (synthesis), orientation, concentration, judgment about danger, reality testing, adaptive ability, executive decision-making, hygiene, and self-preservation. Freud noted that inhibition is one method that the mind may utilize to interfere with any of these functions in order to avoid painful emotions. Hartmann (1950s) pointed out that there may be delays or deficits in such functions.

Frosch (1964) described differences in those people who demonstrated damage to their relationship to reality, but who seemed able to test it.

According to ego psychology, ego strengths, later described by Otto F. Kernberg (1975), include the capacities to control oral, sexual, and destructive impulses; to tolerate painful affects without falling apart; and to prevent the eruption into consciousness of bizarre symbolic fantasy. Synthetic functions, in contrast to autonomous functions, arise from the development of the ego and serve the purpose of managing conflict processes. Defenses are synthetic functions that protect the conscious mind from awareness of forbidden impulses and thoughts. One purpose of ego psychology has been to emphasize that some mental functions can be considered to be basic, rather than derivatives of wishes, affects, or defenses. However, autonomous ego functions can be secondarily affected because of unconscious conflict. For example, a patient may have an hysterical amnesia (memory being an autonomous function) because of intrapsychic conflict (wishing not to remember because it is too painful).

Taken together, the above theories present a group of metapsychological assumptions. Therefore, the inclusive group of the different classical theories provides a cross-sectional view of human mental processes. There are six "points of view", five described by Freud and a sixth added by Hartmann. Unconscious processes can therefore be evaluated from each of these six points of view:

 Topographic
 Dynamic (the theory of conflict)
 Economic (the theory of energy flow)
 Structural
 Genetic (i.e. propositions concerning origin and development of psychological functions)
 Adaptational (i.e. psychological phenomena as it relates to the external world)

Modern conflict theory
Modern conflict theory, a variation of ego psychology, is a revised version of structural theory, most notably different by altering concepts related to where repressed thoughts were stored. Modern conflict theory addresses emotional symptoms and character traits as complex solutions to mental conflict. It dispenses with the concepts of a fixed id, ego and superego, and instead posits conscious and unconscious conflict among wishes (dependent, controlling, sexual, and aggressive), guilt and shame, emotions (especially anxiety and depressive affect), and defensive operations that shut off from consciousness some aspect of the others. Moreover, healthy functioning (adaptive) is also determined, to a great extent, by resolutions of conflict.

A major objective of modern conflict-theory psychoanalysis is to change the balance of conflict in a patient by making aspects of the less adaptive solutions (also called "compromise formations") conscious so that they can be rethought, and more adaptive solutions found. Current theoreticians who follow the work of Charles Brenner, especially The Mind in Conflict (1982), include Sandor Abend, Jacob Arlow, and Jerome Blackman.

Object relations theory
Object relations theory attempts to explain human relationships through a study of how mental representations of the self and others are organized. The clinical symptoms that suggest object relations problems (typically developmental delays throughout life) include disturbances in an individual's capacity to feel: warmth, empathy, trust, sense of security, identity stability, consistent emotional closeness, and stability in relationships with significant others.

Klein discusses the concept of introjection, creating a mental representation of external objects; and projection, applying this mental representation to reality. Wilfred Bion introduced the concept of containment of projections in the mother-child relationship where a mother understands an infants projections, modifies them and returns them to the child.

Concepts regarding internal representation (aka 'introspect', 'self and object representation', or 'internalization of self and other'), although often attributed to Melanie Klein, were actually first mentioned by Sigmund Freud in his early concepts of drive theory (Three Essays on the Theory of Sexuality, 1905). Freud's 1917 paper "Mourning and Melancholia", for example, hypothesized that unresolved grief was caused by the survivor's internalized image of the deceased becoming fused with that of the survivor, and then the survivor shifting unacceptable anger toward the deceased onto the now complex self-image.

Melanie Klein's hypotheses regarding internalization during the first year of life, leading to paranoid and depressive positions, were later challenged by René Spitz (e.g., The First Year of Life, 1965), who divided the first year of life into a coenesthetic phase of the first six months, and then a diacritic phase for the second six months. Mahler, Fine, and Bergman (1975) describe distinct phases and subphases of child development leading to "separation-individuation" during the first three years of life, stressing the importance of constancy of parental figures in the face of the child's destructive aggression,  internalizations, stability of affect management, and ability to develop healthy autonomy.

During adolescence, Erik Erikson (1950–1960s) described the 'identity crisis', that involves identity-diffusion anxiety. In order for an adult to be able to experience "Warm-ETHICS: (warmth, Empathy, Trust, Holding environment, Identity, Closeness, and Stability) in relationships, the teenager must resolve the problems with identity and redevelop self and object constancy.

Self psychology

Self psychology emphasizes the development of a stable and integrated sense of self through empathic contacts with other humans, primary significant others conceived of as 'selfobjects'. Selfobjects meet the developing self's needs for mirroring, idealization, and twinship, and thereby strengthen the developing self. The process of treatment proceeds through "transmuting internalizations" in which the patient gradually internalizes the selfobject functions provided by the therapist.

Self psychology was proposed originally by Heinz Kohut, and has been further developed by Arnold Goldberg, Frank Lachmann, Paul and Anna Ornstein, Marian Tolpin, and others.

Lacanian psychoanalysis
Lacanian psychoanalysis, which integrates psychoanalysis with structural linguistics and Hegelian philosophy, is especially popular in France and parts of Latin America. Lacanian psychoanalysis is a departure from the traditional British and American psychoanalysis. Jacques Lacan frequently used the phrase "retourner à Freud" ("return to Freud") in his seminars and writings, as he claimed that his theories were an extension of Freud's own, contrary to those of Anna Freud, the Ego Psychology, object relations and "self" theories and also claims the necessity of reading Freud's complete works, not only a part of them. Lacan's concepts concern the "mirror stage", the "Real", the "Imaginary", and the "Symbolic", and the claim that "the unconscious is structured as a language."

Though a major influence on psychoanalysis in France and parts of Latin America, Lacan and his ideas have taken longer to be translated into English and he has thus had a lesser impact on psychoanalysis and psychotherapy in the English-speaking world. In the United Kingdom and the United States, his ideas are most widely used to analyze texts in literary theory. Due to his increasingly critical stance towards the deviation from Freud's thought, often singling out particular texts and readings from his colleagues, Lacan was excluded from acting as a training analyst in the IPA, thus leading him to create his own school in order to maintain an institutional structure for the many candidates who desired to continue their analysis with him.

Adaptive paradigm

The adaptive paradigm of psychotherapy develops out of the work of Robert Langs. The adaptive paradigm interprets psychic conflict primarily in terms of conscious and unconscious adaptation to reality. Langs' recent work in some measure returns to the earlier Freud, in that Langs prefers a modified version of the topographic model of the mind (conscious, preconscious, and unconscious) over the structural model (id, ego, and super-ego), including the former's emphasis on trauma (though Langs looks to death-related traumas rather than sexual traumas). At the same time, Langs' model of the mind differs from Freud's in that it understands the mind in terms of evolutionary biological principles.

Relational psychoanalysis
Relational psychoanalysis combines interpersonal psychoanalysis with object-relations theory and with inter-subjective theory as critical for mental health. It was introduced by Stephen Mitchell. Relational psychoanalysis stresses how the individual's personality is shaped by both real and imagined relationships with others, and how these relationship patterns are re-enacted in the interactions between analyst and patient. Relational psychoanalysts have propounded their view of the necessity of helping certain detached, isolated patients, develop the capacity for "mentalization" associated with thinking about relationships and themselves.

Psychopathology (mental disturbances)

Childhood origins
Freudian theories hold that adult problems can be traced to unresolved conflicts from certain phases of childhood and adolescence, caused by fantasy, stemming from their own drives. Freud, based on the data gathered from his patients early in his career, suspected that neurotic disturbances occurred when children were sexually abused in childhood (i.e. seduction theory). Later, Freud came to believe that, although child abuse occurs, neurotic symptoms were not associated with this. He believed that neurotic people often had unconscious conflicts that involved incestuous fantasies deriving from different stages of development. He found the stage from about three to six years of age (preschool years, today called the "first genital stage") to be filled with fantasies of having romantic relationships with both parents. Arguments were quickly generated in early 20th-century Vienna about whether adult seduction of children, i.e. child sexual abuse, was the basis of neurotic illness. There still is no complete agreement, although nowadays professionals recognize the negative effects of child sexual abuse on mental health.

Oedipal conflicts
Many psychoanalysts who work with children have studied the actual effects of child abuse, which include ego and object relations deficits and severe neurotic conflicts. Much research has been done on these types of trauma in childhood, and the adult sequelae of those. In studying the childhood factors that start neurotic symptom development, Freud found a constellation of factors that, for literary reasons, he termed the Oedipus complex, based on the play by Sophocles, Oedipus Rex, in which the protagonist unwittingly kills his father and marries his mother. The validity of the Oedipus complex is now widely disputed and rejected.

The shorthand term, oedipal—later explicated by Joseph J. Sandler in "On the Concept Superego" (1960) and modified by Charles Brenner in The Mind in Conflict (1982)—refers to the powerful attachments that children make to their parents in the preschool years. These attachments involve fantasies of sexual relationships with either (or both) parent, and, therefore, competitive fantasies toward either (or both) parents. Humberto Nagera (1975) has been particularly helpful in clarifying many of the complexities of the child through these years.

"Positive" and "negative" oedipal conflicts have been attached to the heterosexual and homosexual aspects, respectively. Both seem to occur in development of most children. Eventually, the developing child's concessions to reality (that they will neither marry one parent nor eliminate the other) lead to identifications with parental values. These identifications generally create a new set of mental operations regarding values and guilt, subsumed under the term superego. Besides superego development, children "resolve" their preschool oedipal conflicts through channeling wishes into something their parents approve of ("sublimation") and the development, during the school-age years ("latency") of age-appropriate obsessive-compulsive defensive maneuvers (rules, repetitive games).

Treatment

Using the various analytic and psychological techniques to assess mental problems, some believe that there are particular constellations of problems that are especially suited for analytic treatment (see below) whereas other problems might respond better to medicines and other interpersonal interventions. To be treated with psychoanalysis, whatever the presenting problem, the person requesting help must demonstrate a desire to start an analysis. The person wishing to start an analysis must have some capacity for speech and communication. As well, they need to be able to have or develop trust and insight within the psychoanalytic session. Potential patients must undergo a preliminary stage of treatment to assess their amenability to psychoanalysis at that time, and also to enable the analyst to form a working psychological model, which the analyst will use to direct the treatment. Psychoanalysts mainly work with neurosis and hysteria in particular; however, adapted forms of psychoanalysis are used in working with schizophrenia and other forms of psychosis or mental disorder. Finally, if a prospective patient is severely suicidal a longer preliminary stage may be employed, sometimes with sessions which have a twenty-minute break in the middle. There are numerous modifications in technique under the heading of psychoanalysis due to the individualistic nature of personality in both analyst and patient.

The most common problems treatable with psychoanalysis include: phobias, conversions, compulsions, obsessions, anxiety attacks, depressions, sexual dysfunctions, a wide variety of relationship problems (such as dating and marital strife), and a wide variety of character problems (for example, painful shyness, meanness, obnoxiousness, workaholism, hyperseductiveness, hyperemotionality, hyperfastidiousness). The fact that many of such patients also demonstrate deficits above makes diagnosis and treatment selection difficult.

Analytical organizations such as the IPA, APsaA and the European Federation for Psychoanalytic Psychotherapy have established procedures and models for the indication and practice of psychoanalytical therapy for trainees in analysis. The match between the analyst and the patient can be viewed as another contributing factor for the indication and contraindication for psychoanalytic treatment. The analyst decides whether the patient is suitable for psychoanalysis. This decision made by the analyst, besides made on the usual indications and pathology, is also based to a certain degree by the "fit" between analyst and patient. A person's suitability for analysis at any particular time is based on their desire to know something about where their illness has come from.  Someone who is not suitable for analysis expresses no desire to know more about the root causes of their illness.

An evaluation may include one or more other analysts' independent opinions and will include discussion of the patient's financial situation and insurances.

Techniques
The basic method of psychoanalysis is interpretation of the patient's unconscious conflicts that are interfering with current-day functioning – conflicts that are causing painful symptoms such as phobias, anxiety, depression, and compulsions. Strachey (1936) stressed that figuring out ways the patient distorted perceptions about the analyst led to understanding what may have been forgotten. In particular, unconscious hostile feelings toward the analyst could be found in symbolic, negative reactions to what Robert Langs later called the "frame" of the therapy—the setup that included times of the sessions, payment of fees, and necessity of talking. In patients who made mistakes, forgot, or showed other peculiarities regarding time, fees, and talking, the analyst can usually find various unconscious "resistances" to the flow of thoughts (aka free association).

When the patient reclines on a couch with the analyst out of view, the patient tends to remember more experiences, more resistance and transference, and is able to reorganize thoughts after the development of insight – through the interpretive work of the analyst. Although fantasy life can be understood through the examination of dreams, masturbation fantasies are also important. The analyst is interested in how the patient reacts to and avoids such fantasies. Various memories of early life are generally distorted—what Freud called screen memories—and in any case, very early experiences (before age two)—cannot be remembered.

Variations in technique
There is what is known among psychoanalysts as classical technique, although Freud throughout his writings deviated from this considerably, depending on the problems of any given patient.

Classical technique was summarized by Allan Compton as comprising:

 instructions: telling the patient to try to say what's on their mind, including interferences;
 exploration: asking questions; and
 clarification: rephrasing and summarizing what the patient has been describing.

As well, the analyst can also use confrontation to bringing an aspect of functioning, usually a defense, to the patient's attention. The analyst then uses a variety of interpretation methods, such as:

 Dynamic interpretation: explaining how being too nice guards against guilt (e.g. defense vs. affect);
 Genetic interpretation: explaining how a past event is influencing the present;
 Resistance interpretation: showing the patient how they are avoiding their problems;
 Transference interpretation: showing the patient ways old conflicts arise in current relationships, including that with the analyst; or
 Dream interpretation: obtaining the patient's thoughts about their dreams and connecting this with their current problems.

Analysts can also use reconstruction to estimate what may have happened in the past that created some current issue. These techniques are primarily based on conflict theory (see above). As object relations theory evolved, supplemented by the work of John Bowlby and Mary Ainsworth, techniques with patients who had more severe problems with basic trust (Erikson, 1950) and a history of maternal deprivation (see the works of Augusta Alpert) led to new techniques with adults. These have sometimes been called interpersonal, intersubjective (cf. Stolorow), relational, or corrective object relations techniques. These techniques include expressing an empathic attunement to the patient or warmth; exposing a bit of the analyst's personal life or attitudes to the patient; allowing the patient autonomy in the form of disagreement with the analyst (cf. I. H. Paul, Letters to Simon); and explaining the motivations of others which the patient misperceives.

Ego psychological concepts of deficit in functioning led to refinements in supportive therapy. These techniques are particularly applicable to psychotic and near-psychotic (cf., Eric Marcus, "Psychosis and Near-psychosis") patients. These supportive therapy techniques include discussions of reality; encouragement to stay alive (including hospitalization); psychotropic medicines to relieve overwhelming depressive affect or overwhelming fantasies (hallucinations and delusions); and advice about the meanings of things (to counter abstraction failures).

The notion of the "silent analyst" has been criticized. Actually, the analyst listens using Arlow's approach as set out in "The Genesis of Interpretation", using active intervention to interpret resistances, defenses creating pathology, and fantasies. Silence is not a technique of psychoanalysis (see also the studies and opinion papers of Owen Renik). "Analytic neutrality" is a concept that does not mean the analyst is silent. It refers to the analyst's position of not taking sides in the internal struggles of the patient. For example, if a patient feels guilty, the analyst might explore what the patient has been doing or thinking that causes the guilt, but not reassure the patient not to feel guilty. The analyst might also explore the identifications with parents and others that led to the guilt.

Interpersonal–relational psychoanalysts emphasize the notion that it is impossible to be neutral. Sullivan introduced the term participant-observer to indicate the analyst inevitably interacts with the analysand, and suggested the detailed inquiry as an alternative to interpretation. The detailed inquiry involves noting where the analysand is leaving out important elements of an account and noting when the story is obfuscated, and asking careful questions to open up the dialogue.

Group therapy and play therapy
Although single-client sessions remain the norm, psychoanalytic theory has been used to develop other types of psychological treatment. Psychoanalytic group therapy was pioneered by Trigant Burrow, Joseph Pratt, Paul F. Schilder, Samuel R. Slavson, Harry Stack Sullivan, and Wolfe. Child-centered counseling for parents was instituted early in analytic history by Freud, and was later further developed by Irwin Marcus, Edith Schulhofer, and Gilbert Kliman. Psychoanalytically based couples therapy has been promulgated and explicated by Fred Sander. Techniques and tools developed in the first decade of the 21st century have made psychoanalysis available to patients who were not treatable by earlier techniques. This meant that the analytic situation was modified so that it would be more suitable and more likely to be helpful for these patients. Eagle (2007) believes that psychoanalysis cannot be a self-contained discipline but instead must be open to influence from and integration with findings and theory from other disciplines.

Psychoanalytic constructs have been adapted for use with children with treatments such as play therapy, art therapy, and storytelling. Throughout her career, from the 1920s through the 1970s, Anna Freud adapted psychoanalysis for children through play. This is still used today for children, especially those who are preadolescent. Using toys and games, children are able to symbolically demonstrate their fears, fantasies, and defenses; although not identical, this technique, in children, is analogous to the aim of free association in adults. Psychoanalytic play therapy allows the child and analyst to understand children's conflicts, particularly defenses such as disobedience and withdrawal, that have been guarding against various unpleasant feelings and hostile wishes. In art therapy, the counselor may have a child draw a portrait and then tell a story about the portrait. The counselor watches for recurring themes—regardless of whether it is with art or toys.

Cultural variations
Psychoanalysis can be adapted to different cultures, as long as the therapist or counselor understands the client's culture. For example, Tori and Blimes found that defense mechanisms were valid in a normative sample of 2,624 Thais. The use of certain defense mechanisms was related to cultural values. For example, Thais value calmness and collectiveness (because of Buddhist beliefs), so they were low on regressive emotionality. Psychoanalysis also applies because Freud used techniques that allowed him to get the subjective perceptions of his patients. He takes an objective approach by not facing his clients during his talk therapy sessions. He met with his patients wherever they were, such as when he used free association—where clients would say whatever came to mind without self-censorship. His treatments had little to no structure for most cultures, especially Asian cultures. Therefore, it is more likely that Freudian constructs will be used in structured therapy. In addition, Corey postulates that it will be necessary for a therapist to help clients develop a cultural identity as well as an ego identity.

Psychodynamic therapy
Psychodynamic therapies refer therapies that draw from psychoanalytic approaches but are designed to be shorter in duration or less intensive.

Cost and length of treatment

The cost to the patient of psychoanalytic treatment ranges widely from place to place and between practitioners. Low-fee analysis is often available in a psychoanalytic training clinic and graduate schools. Otherwise, the fee set by each analyst varies with the analyst's training and experience. Since, in most locations in the United States, unlike in Ontario and Germany, classical analysis (which usually requires sessions three to five times per week) is not covered by health insurance, many analysts may negotiate their fees with patients whom they feel they can help, but who have financial difficulties. The modifications of analysis, which include psychodynamic therapy, brief therapies, and certain types of group therapy, are carried out on a less frequent basis—usually once, twice, or three times a week – and usually the patient sits facing the therapist. As a result of the defense mechanisms and the lack of access to the unfathomable elements of the unconscious, psychoanalysis can be an expansive process that involves 2 to 5 sessions per week for several years. This type of therapy relies on the belief that reducing the symptoms will not actually help with the root causes or irrational drives. The analyst typically is a 'blank screen', disclosing very little about themselves in order that the client can use the space in the relationship to work on their unconscious without interference from outside.

The psychoanalyst uses various methods to help the patient to become more self-aware and to develop insights into their behavior and into the meanings of symptoms. First and foremost, the psychoanalyst attempts to develop a confidential atmosphere in which the patient can feel safe reporting his feelings, thoughts and fantasies. Analysands (as people in analysis are called) are asked to report whatever comes to mind without fear of reprisal. Freud called this the "fundamental rule". Analysands are asked to talk about their lives, including their early life, current life and hopes and aspirations for the future. They are encouraged to report their fantasies, "flash thoughts" and dreams. In fact, Freud believed that dreams were, "the royal road to the unconscious"; he devoted an entire volume to the interpretation of dreams. Freud had his patients lay on a couch in a dimly lit room and would sit out of sight, usually directly behind them, as to not influence the patients thoughts by his gestures or expressions.

The psychoanalyst's task, in collaboration with the analysand, is to help deepen the analysand's understanding of those factors, outside of his awareness, that drive his behaviors. In the safe environment of the psychoanalytic setting, the analysand becomes attached to the analyst and pretty soon he begins to experience the same conflicts with his analyst that he experiences with key figures in his life such as his parents, his boss, his significant other, etc. It is the psychoanalyst's role to point out these conflicts and to interpret them. The transferring of these internal conflicts onto the analyst is called "transference".

Many studies have also been done on briefer "dynamic" treatments; these are more expedient to measure, and shed light on the therapeutic process to some extent. Brief Relational Therapy (BRT), Brief Psychodynamic Therapy (BPT), and Time-Limited Dynamic Therapy (TLDP) limit treatment to 20–30 sessions. On average, classical analysis may last 5.7 years, but for phobias and depressions uncomplicated by ego deficits or object relations deficits, analysis may run for a shorter period of time. Longer analyses are indicated for those with more serious disturbances in object relations, more symptoms, and more ingrained character pathology.

Training and research
Psychoanalysis continues to be practiced by psychiatrists, social workers, and other mental health professionals; however, its practice has declined. It has been largely replaced by the similar but broader psychodynamic psychotherapy in the mid-20th century. Psychoanalytic approaches continue to be listed by the UK National Health Service as possibly helpful for depression.

United States

Psychoanalytic training in the United States involves a personal psychoanalysis for the trainee, approximately 600 hours of class instruction, with a standard curriculum, over a four or five-year period.

Typically, this psychoanalysis must be conducted by a Supervising and Training Analyst. Most institutes (but not all) within the American Psychoanalytic Association, require that Supervising and Training Analysts become certified by the American Board of Psychoanalysts. Certification entails a blind review in which the psychoanalyst's work is vetted by psychoanalysts outside of their local community. After earning certification, these psychoanalysts undergo another hurdle in which they are specially vetted by senior members of their own institute. Supervising and Training analysts are held to the highest clinical and ethical standards. Moreover, they are required to have extensive experience conducting psychoanalyses.

Similarly, class instruction for psychoanalytic candidates is rigorous. Typically classes meet several hours a week, or for a full day or two every other weekend during the academic year; this varies with the institute.

Candidates generally have an hour of supervision each week, with a Supervising and Training Analyst, on each psychoanalytic case. The minimum number of cases varies between institutes, often two to four cases. Male and female cases are required. Supervision must go on for at least a few years on one or more cases. Supervision is done in the supervisor's office, where the trainee presents material from the psychoanalytic work that week. In supervision, the patient's unconscious conflicts are explored, also, transference-countertransference constellations are examined. Also, clinical technique is taught.

Many psychoanalytic training centers in the United States have been accredited by special committees of the APsaA or the IPA. Because of theoretical differences, there are independent institutes, usually founded by psychologists, who until 1987 were not permitted access to psychoanalytic training institutes of the APsaA. Currently there are between 75 and 100 independent institutes in the United States.  As well, other institutes are affiliated to other organizations such as the American Academy of Psychoanalysis and Dynamic Psychiatry, and the National Association for the Advancement of Psychoanalysis. At most psychoanalytic institutes in the United States, qualifications for entry include a terminal degree in a mental health field, such as Ph.D., Psy.D., M.S.W., or M.D. A few institutes restrict applicants to those already holding an M.D. or Ph.D., and most institutes in Southern California confer a Ph.D. or Psy.D. in psychoanalysis upon graduation, which involves completion of the necessary requirements for the state boards that confer that doctoral degree. The first training institute in America to educate non-medical psychoanalysts was The National Psychological Association for Psychoanalysis (1978) in New York City. It was founded by the analyst Theodor Reik. The Contemporary Freudian (originally the New York Freudian Society) an offshoot of the National Psychological Association has a branch in Washington, DC.  It is a component society/institute or the IPA.

Some psychoanalytic training has been set up as a post-doctoral fellowship in university settings, such as at Duke University, Yale University, New York University, Adelphi University and Columbia University. Other psychoanalytic institutes may not be directly associated with universities, but the faculty at those institutes usually hold contemporaneous faculty positions with psychology Ph.D. programs and/or with medical school psychiatry residency programs.

The IPA is the world's primary accrediting and regulatory body for psychoanalysis. Their mission is to assure the continued vigor and development of psychoanalysis for the benefit of psychoanalytic patients. It works in partnership with its 70 constituent organizations in 33 countries to support 11,500 members. In the US, there are 77 psychoanalytical organizations, institutes and associations, which are spread across the states. APsaA has 38 affiliated societies which have 10 or more active members who practice in a given geographical area. The aims of APsaA and other psychoanalytical organizations are: provide ongoing educational opportunities for its members, stimulate the development and research of psychoanalysis, provide training and organize conferences. There are eight affiliated study groups in the United States. A study group is the first level of integration of a psychoanalytical body within the IPA, followed by a provisional society and finally a member society.

The Division of Psychoanalysis (39) of the American Psychological Association (APA) was established in the early 1980s by several psychologists.  Until the establishment of the Division of Psychoanalysis, psychologists who had trained in independent institutes had no national organization. The Division of Psychoanalysis now has approximately 4,000 members and approximately 30 local chapters in the United States. The Division of Psychoanalysis holds two annual meetings or conferences and offers continuing education in theory, research and clinical technique, as do their affiliated local chapters. The European Psychoanalytical Federation (EPF) is the organization which consolidates all European psychoanalytic societies. This organization is affiliated with the IPA. In 2002, there were approximately 3,900 individual members in 22 countries, speaking 18 different languages. There are also 25 psychoanalytic societies.

The American Association of Psychoanalysis in Clinical Social Work (AAPCSW) was established by Crayton Rowe in 1980 as a division of the Federation of Clinical Societies of Social Work and became an independent entity in 1990. Until 2007 it was known as the National Membership Committee on Psychoanalysis. The organization was founded because although social workers represented the larger number of people who were training to be psychoanalysts, they were underrepresented as supervisors and teachers at the institutes they attended.  AAPCSW now has over 1000 members and has over 20 chapters. It holds a bi-annual national conference and numerous annual local conferences.

Experiences of psychoanalysts and psychoanalytic psychotherapists and research into infant and child development have led to new insights. Theories have been further developed and the results of empirical research are now more integrated in the psychoanalytic theory.

United Kingdom

The London Psychoanalytical Society was founded by Ernest Jones on 30 October 1913. After World War I with the expansion of psychoanalysis in the United Kingdom, the Society was reconstituted and named the British Psychoanalytical Society in 1919. Soon after, the Institute of Psychoanalysis was established to administer the Society's activities. These include: the training of psychoanalysts, the development of the theory and practice of psychoanalysis, the provision of treatment through The London Clinic of Psychoanalysis, the publication of books in The New Library of Psychoanalysis and Psychoanalytic Ideas. The Institute of Psychoanalysis also publishes The International Journal of Psychoanalysis, maintains a library, furthers research, and holds public lectures. The society has a Code of Ethics and an Ethical Committee. The society, the institute and the clinic are all located at Byron House in West London.

The Society is a constituent society of the International Psychoanalytical Association (IPA) a body with members on all five continents which safeguards professional and ethical practice. The Society is a member of the British Psychoanalytic Council (BPC); the BPC publishes a register of British psychoanalysts and psychoanalytical psychotherapists. All members of the British Psychoanalytic Council are required to undertake continuing professional development, CPD. Members of the Society teach and hold posts on other approved psychoanalytic courses, e.g.: British Psychotherapy Foundation and in academic departments, e.g.University College London.

Members of the Society have included: Michael Balint, Wilfred Bion, John Bowlby, Ronald Fairbairn, Anna Freud, Harry Guntrip, Melanie Klein, Donald Meltzer, Joseph J. Sandler, Hanna Segal, J. D. Sutherland and Donald Winnicott.

The Institute of Psychoanalysis is the foremost publisher of psychoanalytic literature. The 24-volume Standard Edition of the Complete Psychological Works of Sigmund Freud was conceived, translated, and produced under the direction of the British Psychoanalytical Society. The Society, in conjunction with Random House, will soon publish a new, revised and expanded Standard Edition. With the New Library of Psychoanalysis the Institute continues to publish the books of leading theorists and practitioners. The International Journal of Psychoanalysis is published by the Institute of Psychoanalysis. Now in its 84th year, it has one of the largest circulations of any psychoanalytic journal.

Psychoanalytic psychotherapy
There are different forms of psychoanalysis and psychotherapies in which psychoanalytic thinking is practiced. Besides classical psychoanalysis there is for example psychoanalytic psychotherapy, a therapeutic approach which widens "the accessibility of psychoanalytic theory and clinical practices that had evolved over 100 plus years to a larger number of individuals." Other examples of well known therapies which also use insights of psychoanalysis are mentalization-based treatment (MBT), and transference focused psychotherapy (TFP). There is also a continuing influence of psychoanalytic thinking in mental health care.

Research

Over a hundred years of case reports and studies in the journal Modern Psychoanalysis, the Psychoanalytic Quarterly, the International Journal of Psychoanalysis and the Journal of the American Psychoanalytic Association have analyzed the efficacy of analysis in cases of neurosis and character or personality problems. Psychoanalysis modified by object relations techniques has been shown to be effective in many cases of ingrained problems of intimacy and relationship (cf. the many books of Otto Kernberg). Psychoanalytic treatment, in other situations, may run from about a year to many years, depending on the severity and complexity of the pathology.

Psychoanalytic theory has, from its inception, been the subject of criticism and controversy. Freud remarked on this early in his career, when other physicians in Vienna ostracized him for his findings that hysterical conversion symptoms were not limited to women. Challenges to analytic theory began with Otto Rank and Alfred Adler (turn of the 20th century), continued with behaviorists (e.g. Wolpe) into the 1940s and '50s, and have persisted (e.g. Miller). Criticisms come from those who object to the notion that there are mechanisms, thoughts or feelings in the mind that could be unconscious. Criticisms also have been leveled against the idea of "infantile sexuality" (the recognition that children between ages two and six imagine things about procreation). Criticisms of theory have led to variations in analytic theories, such as the work of Ronald Fairbairn, Michael Balint, and John Bowlby. In the past 30 years or so, the criticisms have centered on the issue of empirical verification.

Psychoanalysis has been used as a research tool into childhood development (cf. the journal The Psychoanalytic Study of the Child), and has developed into a flexible, effective treatment for certain mental disturbances. In the 1960s, Freud's early (1905) thoughts on the childhood development of female sexuality were challenged; this challenge led to major research in the 1970s and 80s, and then to a reformulation of female sexual development that corrected some of Freud's concepts. Also see the various works of Eleanor Galenson, Nancy Chodorow, Karen Horney, Françoise Dolto, Melanie Klein, Selma Fraiberg, and others. Most recently, psychoanalytic researchers who have integrated attachment theory into their work, including Alicia Lieberman, Susan Coates, and Daniel Schechter have explored the role of parental traumatization in the development of young children's mental representations of self and others.

Effectiveness
The psychoanalytic profession has been resistant to researching efficacy. Evaluations of effectiveness based on the interpretation of the therapist alone cannot be proven.

Research results
Numerous studies have shown that the efficacy of therapy is primarily related to the quality of the therapist, rather than to the school or technique or training.

Meta-analyses in 2012 and 2013 found support or evidence for the efficacy of psychoanalytic therapy, but further research is needed. Other meta-analyses published in recent years showed psychoanalysis and psychodynamic therapy to be effective, with outcomes comparable to or greater than other kinds of psychotherapy or antidepressant drugs, but these meta-analyses have been subjected to various criticisms. In particular, the inclusion of pre/post studies rather than randomized controlled trials, and the absence of adequate comparisons with control treatments, is a serious limitation in interpreting the results. A French 2004 report from INSERM concluded that psychoanalytic therapy is less effective than other psychotherapies (including cognitive behavioral therapy) for certain diseases.

In 2011, the American Psychological Association made 103 comparisons between psychodynamic treatment and a non-dynamic competitor and found that 6 were superior, 5 were inferior, 28 showed no difference, and 63 were adequate. The study found that this could be used as a basis "to make psychodynamic psychotherapy an 'empirically validated' treatment."

Meta-analyses of Short Term Psychodynamic Psychotherapy (STPP) have found effect sizes (Cohen's d) ranging from 0.34 to 0.71 compared to no treatment and was found to be slightly better than other therapies in follow up. Other reviews have found an effect size of 0.78 to 0.91 for somatic disorders compared to no treatment  and 0.69 for treating depression. A 2012 Harvard Review of Psychiatry meta-analysis of Intensive Short-Term Dynamic Psychotherapy (ISTDP) found effect sizes ranging from 0.84 for interpersonal problems to 1.51 for depression. Overall ISTDP had an effect size of 1.18 compared to no treatment.

A meta-analysis of Long Term Psychodynamic Psychotherapy in 2012 found an overall effect size of 0.33, which is modest. This study concluded the recovery rate following LTPP was equal to control treatments, including treatment as usual, and found the evidence for the effectiveness of LTPP to be limited and at best conflicting. Others have found effect sizes of 0.44–0.68.

According to a 2004 French review conducted by INSERM, psychoanalysis was presumed or proven effective at treating panic disorder, post-traumatic stress, and personality disorders, but did  not find evidence of its effectiveness in treating schizophrenia, obsessive compulsive disorder, specific phobia, bulimia and anorexia.

A 2001 systematic review of the medical literature by the Cochrane Collaboration concluded that no data exist demonstrating that psychodynamic psychotherapy is effective in treating schizophrenia and severe mental illness, and cautioned that medication should always be used alongside any type of talk therapy in schizophrenia cases. A French review from 2004 found the same. The Schizophrenia Patient Outcomes Research Team advises against the use of psychodynamic therapy in cases of schizophrenia, arguing that more trials are necessary to verify its effectiveness.

Criticism

Both Freud and psychoanalysis have been criticized in extreme terms. Exchanges between critics and defenders of psychoanalysis have often been so heated that they have come to be characterized as the Freud Wars. Linguist Noam Chomsky has criticized psychoanalysis for lacking a scientific basis. Evolutionary biologist Stephen Jay Gould considered psychoanalysis influenced by pseudoscientific theories such as recapitulation theory. Psychologists Hans Eysenck, John F. Kihlstrom and others have also criticized the field as pseudoscience.

Debate over status as scientific
The theoretical foundations of psychoanalysis lie in the same philosophical currents that lead to interpretive phenomenology rather than in those that lead to scientific positivism, making the theory largely incompatible with positivist approaches to the study of the mind.

Early critics of psychoanalysis believed that its theories were based too little on quantitative and experimental research, and too much on the clinical case study method.  Philosopher Frank Cioffi cites false claims of a sound scientific verification of the theory and its elements as the strongest basis for classifying the work of Freud and his school as pseudoscience.

Karl Popper argued that psychoanalysis is a pseudoscience because its claims are not testable and cannot be refuted; that is, they are not falsifiable:In addition, Imre Lakatos wrote that "Freudians have been nonplussed by Popper's basic challenge concerning scientific honesty. Indeed, they have refused to specify experimental conditions under which they would give up their basic assumptions." In Sexual Desire (1986), philosopher Roger Scruton rejects Popper's arguments pointing to the theory of repression as an example of a Freudian theory that does have testable consequences. Scruton nevertheless concluded that psychoanalysis is not genuinely scientific, on the grounds that it involves an unacceptable dependence on metaphor. The philosopher and physicist Mario Bunge argued that psychoanalysis is a pseudoscience because it violates the ontology and methodology inherent to science. According to Bunge, most psychoanalytic theories are either untestable or unsupported by evidence.

Cognitive scientists, in particular, have also weighed in. Martin Seligman, a prominent academic in positive psychology, wrote that:Adolf Grünbaum argues in Validation in the Clinical Theory of Psychoanalysis (1993) that psychoanalytic based theories are falsifiable, but that the causal claims of psychoanalysis are unsupported by the available clinical evidence.

Historian Henri Ellenberger, who researched the history of Freud, Jung, Adler, and Janet, while writing his book The Discovery of the Unconscious: The History and Evolution of Dynamic Psychiatry, argued that psychoanalysis was not scientific on the grounds of both its methodology and social structure:

Freud
Some have accused Freud of fabrication, most famously in the case of Anna O. Others have speculated that patients had conditions that are now easily identifiable and unrelated to psychoanalysis; for instance, Anna O. is thought to have had an organic impairment such as tuberculous meningitis or temporal lobe epilepsy, rather than Freud's diagnosis of hysteria.

Henri Ellenberger and Frank Sulloway argue that Freud and his followers created an inaccurate legend of Freud to popularize psychoanalysis. Borch-Jacobson and Shamdasani argue that this legend has been adapted to different times and situations. Isabelle Stengers states that psychoanalytic circles have tried to stop historians from accessing documents about the life of Freud.

Witch doctors
Richard Feynman wrote off psychoanalysts as mere "witch doctors":

Likewise, psychiatrist E. Fuller Torrey, in Witchdoctors and Psychiatrists (1986), agreed that psychoanalytic theories have no more scientific basis than the theories of traditional native healers, "witchdoctors" or modern "cult" alternatives such as EST. Psychologist Alice Miller charged psychoanalysis with being similar to the poisonous pedagogies, which she described in her book For Your Own Good. She scrutinized and rejected the validity of Freud's drive theory, including the Oedipus complex, which, according to her and Jeffrey Masson, blames the child for the abusive sexual behavior of adults. Psychologist Joel Kupfersmid investigated the validity of the Oedipus complex, examining its nature and origins. He concluded that there is little evidence to support the existence of the Oedipus complex.

Critical perspectives

Contemporary French philosophers Michel Foucault and Gilles Deleuze asserted that the institution of psychoanalysis has become a center of power, and that its confessional techniques resemble those included and utilized within the Christian religion. French psychoanalyst Jacques Lacan criticized the emphasis of some American and British psychoanalytical traditions on what he has viewed as the suggestion of imaginary "causes" for symptoms, and recommended the return to Freud. Together with Deleuze, the French psychoanalyst and psychiatrist Félix Guattari criticized the Oedipal and schizophrenic power structure of psychoanalysis and its connivance with capitalism in Anti-Oedipus (1972) and A Thousand Plateaus (1980), the two volumes of their theoretical work Capitalism and Schizophrenia. Belgian psycholinguist and psychoanalyst Luce Irigaray also criticized psychoanalysis, employing Jacques Derrida's concept of phallogocentrism to describe the exclusion of the woman both from Freudian and Lacanian psychoanalytical theories. Deleuze and Guattari in Anti-Oedipus take the cases of Gérard Mendel, Bela Grunberger, and Janine Chasseguet-Smirgel, prominent members of the most respected psychoanalytical associations (including the IPA), to suggest that, traditionally, psychoanalysis had always enthusiastically enjoyed and embraced a police state throughout its history.

Freudian theory

A survey of scientific research suggested that while personality traits corresponding to Freud's oral, anal, Oedipal, and genital phases can be observed, they do not necessarily manifest as stages in the development of children. These studies also have not confirmed that such traits in adults result from childhood experiences. However, these stages should not be viewed as crucial to modern psychoanalysis. What is crucial to modern psychoanalytic theory and practice is the power of the unconscious and the transference phenomenon.

The idea of "unconscious" is contested because human behavior can be observed while human mental activity has to be inferred. However, the unconscious is now a popular topic of study in the fields of experimental and social psychology (e.g., implicit attitude measures, fMRI, and PET scans, and other indirect tests). The idea of unconscious, and the transference phenomenon, have been widely researched and, it is claimed, validated in the fields of cognitive psychology and social psychology, though a Freudian interpretation of unconscious mental activity is not held by the majority of cognitive psychologists. Recent developments in neuroscience have resulted in one side arguing that it has provided a biological basis for unconscious emotional processing in line with psychoanalytic theory i.e., neuropsychoanalysis, while the other side argues that such findings make psychoanalytic theory obsolete and irrelevant.

Shlomo Kalo explains that the scientific materialism that flourished in the 19th century severely harmed religion and rejected whatever called spiritual. The institution of the confession priest in particular was badly damaged. The empty void that this institution left behind was swiftly occupied by the newborn psychoanalysis. In his writings, Kalo claims that psychoanalysis basic approach is erroneous. It represents the mainline wrong assumptions that happiness is unreachable and that the natural desire of a human being is to exploit his fellow men for his own pleasure and benefit.

Jacques Derrida incorporated aspects of psychoanalytic theory into his theory of deconstruction in order to question what he called the 'metaphysics of presence'.  Derrida also turns some of these ideas against Freud, to reveal tensions and contradictions in his work. For example, although Freud defines religion and metaphysics as displacements of the identification with the father in the resolution of the Oedipal complex, Derrida (1987) insists that the prominence of the father in Freud's own analysis is itself indebted to the prominence given to the father in Western metaphysics and theology since Plato.

See also
 Analytical psychology
 Glossary of psychoanalysis
 List of schools of psychoanalysis
 Psychoanalytic sociology
 Psychoanalysis and music
 Training analysis

Notes

References

Further reading

Introductions
Brenner, Charles (1954). An Elementary Textbook of Psychoanalysis.
Elliott, Anthony (2002). Psychoanalytic Theory: An Introduction (2nd ed.). Duke University Press. --An introduction that explains psychoanalytic theory with interpretations of major theorists.
 Fine, Reuben (1990). The History of Psychoanalysis. (expanded ed.). Northvale: Jason Aronson.
 Samuel, Lawrence R. (2013). Shrink: A Cultural History of Psychoanalysis in America. University of Nebraska Press. 253 pp.
Freud, Sigmund (2014) [1926]. "Psychoanalysis." Encyclopædia Britannica.

Reference works
de Mijolla, Alain, ed. (2005). International dictionary of psychoanalysis [enhanced American version] 1,2,&3. Detroit: Thomson/Gale.
Laplanche, Jean, and J. B. Pontalis (1974). "The Language of Psycho-Analysis". W. W. Norton & Company. 
Freud, Sigmund (1940). An Outline of Psychoanalysis. ePenguin.;General 
Edelson, Marshall (1984). Hypothesis and Evidence in Psychoanalysis. Chicago: Chicago University Press. 
Etchegoyen, Horacio (2005). The Fundamentals of Psychoanalytic Technique (new ed.). Karnac Books. 
Gellner, Ernest. The Psychoanalytic Movement: The Cunning of Unreason, . A critical view of Freudian theory. 
Green, André (2005). "Psychoanalysis: A Paradigm For Clinical Thinking". Free Association Books. 
Irigaray, Luce (2004). Key Writings. Continuum. 
Jacobson, Edith (1976). Depression; Comparative Studies of Normal, Neurotic, and Psychotic Conditions. International Universities Press. 
 Kernberg, Otto (1993). Severe Personality Disorders: Psychotherapeutic Strategies. Yale University Press.  
Kohut, Heinz (2000). Analysis of the Self: Systematic Approach to Treatment of Narcissistic Personality Disorders. International Universities Press. 
Kovacevic, Filip (2007). Liberating Oedipus? Psychoanalysis as Critical Theory. Lexington Books.  
Kristeva, Julia (1986). The Kristeva Reader, edited by T. Moi. Columbia University Press. 
Meltzer, Donald (1983). Dream-Life: A Re-Examination of the Psycho-Analytical Theory and Technique.  Karnac Books. 
— (1998). The Kleinian Development (new ed.). Karnac Books; reprint:  
Mitchell, S. A., and M. J. Black (1995). Freud and beyond: a history of modern psychoanalytic thought. New York: Basic Books. pp. xviii–xx.
Pollock, Griselda (2006). "Beyond Oedipus. Feminist Thought, Psychoanalysis, and Mythical Figurations of the Feminine." In Laughing with Medusa, edited by V. Zajko and M. Leonard. Oxford: Oxford University Press. 
Spielrein, Sabina (1993). Destruction as cause of becoming. 
Stoller, Robert (1993). Presentations of Gender. Yale University Press. 
Stolorow, Robert, George Atwood, and Donna Orange (2002). Worlds of Experience: Interweaving Philosophical and Clinical Dimensions in Psychoanalysis. New York: Basic Books.
Spitz, René (2006). The First Year of Life: Psychoanalytic Study of Normal and Deviant Development of Object Relations. International Universities Press. 
Tähkä, Veikko (1993). Mind and Its Treatment: A Psychoanalytic Approach. Madison, CT: International Universities Press.

Book series
Contemporary Psychoanalytic Studies. Amsterdam & New York: Rodopi.

Analyses, discussions and critiques

Aziz, Robert (2007). The Syndetic Paradigm: The Untrodden Path Beyond Freud and Jung, Albany: State University of New York Press. 
Borch-Jacobsen, Mikkel (1991). Lacan: The Absolute Master, Stanford: Stanford University Press. 
Borch-Jacobsen, Mikkel (1996). Remembering Anna O: A Century of Mystification, London: Routledge. 
Borch-Jacobsen, Mikkel and Shamdasani, Sonu (2012). The Freud Files: An Inquiry into the History of Psychoanalysis, Cambridge University Press. .

 Burnham, John, ed. (2012). After Freud Left: A Century of Psychoanalysis in America, University of Chicago Press.
Cioffi, Frank. (1998). Freud and the Question of Pseudoscience, Open Court Publishing Company. 
Crews, Frederick (1986).  Skeptical Engagements, New York: Oxford University Press.  .  Part I of this volume, entitled "The Freudian Temptation," includes five essays critical of psychoanalysis written between 1975 and 1986.
Crews, Frederick (1995). The Memory Wars: Freud's Legacy in Dispute, New York: New York Review of Books. 
Crews, Frederick, ed. (1998). Unauthorized Freud: Doubters Confront a Legend, New York: Viking. 
Crews, Frederick (2017). Freud: The Making of an Illusion, Metropolitan Books. 
Dufresne, Todd (2000). Tales From the Freudian Crypt: The Death Drive in Text and Context, Stanford: Stanford University Press. 
— (2007). Against Freud: Critics Talk Back, Stanford: Stanford University Press. 
Erwin, Edward (1996), A Final Accounting: Philosophical and Empirical Issues in Freudian Psychology. 
Esterson, Allen (1993). Seductive Mirage: An Exploration of the Work of Sigmund Freud. Chicago: Open Court. 
Fisher, Seymour, and Roger P. Greenberg (1977). The Scientific Credibility of Freud's Theories and Therapy. New York: Basic Books.
— (1996). Freud Scientifically Reappraised: Testing the Theories and Therapy. New York: John Wiley.
Gellner, Ernest (1993), The Psychoanalytic Movement: The Cunning of Unreason. A critical view of Freudian theory. 

— (1985). The Foundations of Psychoanalysis: A Philosophical Critique. 
Macmillan, Malcolm (1997), Freud Evaluated: The Completed Arc. 

Roustang, Francois (1982). Dire Mastery: Discipleship from Freud to Lacan. Baltimore: Johns Hopkins University Press. 
Webster, Richard. (1995). Why Freud Was Wrong: Sin, Science, and Psychoanalysis, New York: Basic Books, Harper Collins. 
Wollheim, Richard, editor. (1974). Freud: A Collection of Critical Essays. New York: Anchor Books.

Responses to critiques

 Köhler, Thomas 1996: Anti-Freud-Literatur von ihren Anfängen bis heute. Zur wissenschaftlichen Fundierung von Psychoanalyse-Kritik. Stuttgart: Kohlhammer Verlag. 
 Ollinheimo, Ari — Vuorinen, Risto (1999): Metapsychology and the Suggestion Argument: A Reply to Grünbaum's Critique of Psychoanalysis. Commentationes Scientiarum Socialium, 53. Helsinki: Finnish Academy of Science and Letters. 
Robinson, Paul (1993). Freud and his Critics. Berkeley & Los Angeles: University of California Press. 
Gomez, Lavinia: The Freud Wars: An Introduction to the Philosophy of Psychoanalysis. Routledge, 2005. Review: Psychodynamic Practice 14(1):108–111. Feb., 2008.

External links

 International Psychoanalytical Association (IPA) – world's primary regulatory body for psychoanalysis, founded by Sigmund Freud
 Psychoanalysis – Division 39 – American Psychological Association (APA)